Liberty Hall in Dublin, Ireland is the headquarters of the Services, Industrial, Professional, and Technical Union.

Liberty Hall may also refer to:

Buildings

Australia
Liberty Hall, Ipswich

United States
Liberty Hall (Camden, Alabama)
Liberty Hall (Oakland, California)
Liberty Hall (Americus, Georgia)
Liberty Hall (Crawfordville, Georgia)
Liberty Hall (Lamoni, Iowa)
Liberty Hall (Frankfort, Kentucky)
Liberty Hall (Machiasport, Maine)
Liberty Hall (Westover, Maryland)
Liberty Hall (Barnstable, Massachusetts)
Liberty Hall (New Jersey)
Liberty Hall (Kenansville, North Carolina)
Liberty Hall (Windsor, North Carolina)
Liberty Hall (Quakertown, Pennsylvania)
 Liberty Hall (Houston, Texas)
 Liberty Hall (Tyler, Texas)
Liberty Hall (Forest, Virginia)
Liberty Hall Academy, now Washington and Lee University
Liberty Hall Site
Liberty Hall, the land surrounding the Liberty Tree in Boston, Massachusetts

Arts and entertainment

 Liberty Hall, a fictional location in Oliver Goldsmith's 1773 play She Stoops to Conquer
 Liberty Hall (play), by R. C. Carton, 1892
 Liberty Hall (film), a 1914 silent film adaptation of Carton's play
 Liberty Hall, a 1985 album by Oysterband

Other uses
 Liberty Hall Formation is a geologic formation in Virginia, U.S.

See also
Independence Hall (disambiguation)